Leninkent is the name of several inhabited localities in the Republic of Dagestan, Russia.

Urban localities
Leninkent, Makhachkala, Republic of Dagestan, a settlement under the administrative jurisdiction of Kirovsky City District of the City of Makhachkala; 

Rural localities
Leninkent, Karabudakhkentsky District, Republic of Dagestan, a selo in Gubdensky Selsoviet of Karabudakhkentsky District;